Events from the year 1577 in art.

Events
El Greco moves from Rome to Spain, where he will spend the rest of his life.
The Accademia di San Luca is founded as an association of artists in Rome.

Works

Some dates approximate
Lavinia Fontana - Self-Portrait at the Clavichord Accompanied by a Handmaiden
El Greco - The Repentant Magdalen
Nicholas Hilliard - Portrait miniatures
The Duke of Alençon
Marguerite of Navarre
Self-portrait
Cornelis Ketel - Martin Frobisher

Births
March 20 - Alessandro Tiarini, Italian Baroque painter of frescoes, façade decorations, and altarpieces (died 1668)
June 28 – Peter Paul Rubens, Flemish painter (died 1640)
July 21 - Adam Willaerts, Dutch painter (died 1664)
October 17 - Cristofano Allori, Italian painter (died 1621)
December 8 - Mario Minniti, Italian painter,  also the model for Caravaggio's painting Boy with a Basket of Fruit  (died 1640)
date unknown
Eugenio Caxés, Spanish painter (died 1634)
Giacomo Cavedone, Italian painter of the Bolognese School (died 1660)
Giovanni Battista Crescenzi, Italian painter and architect (died 1635)
Aart Jansz Druyvesteyn, Dutch Golden Age painter (died 1627)
Cornelis van der Geest, Dutch merchant and art collector (died 1638)

Deaths
February 17 - Giuliano Bugiardini, Italian painter (born 1475)
May - Richard Aertsz, Dutch historical painter (born 1482)
June 12 - Orazio Samacchini, Italian Mannerist painter (born 1532)
date unknown
Juan de Juni, French–Spanish sculptor (born 1507)
Léonard Limousin, French painter, member of Limoges enamel painter family (born 1505)
Guglielmo della Porta, Italian architect and sculptor (born c.1500)
Antonis Mor, Dutch portrait painter (born 1517)
Cristóbal Ramírez, painter and illuminator of manuscripts for King Philip II of Spain
Lorenzo Sabbatini, Italian painter (born 1530)
Michele Tosini, Italian Mannerist painter (born 1503)
probable - Gert van Groningen, Danish sculptor (date of birth unknown)

 
Years of the 16th century in art